Native Sense - The New Duets is an album by vibraphonist Gary Burton and the pianist Chick Corea, released in 1997 on the Concord label. The album is the fourth studio recording by the duo following Crystal Silence (1972), Duet (1978) and Lyric Suite for Sextet (1982). The album peaked number 25 in the Billboard Top Jazz Albums chart.

Reception 
The AllMusic review by Richard S. Ginell stated: "This is the product of two mature masters in their mid-fifties from the jazz-rock era who know precisely what they want from their instruments and reject stylistic boundaries".

Track listing 
All compositions by Chick Corea except where noted.
 Native Sense" –    
 "Love Castle" – 
 "Duende" – 
 "No Mystery" – 
 "Armando's Rhumba" – 
 "Bagatelle #6" (Béla Bartók) –  
 "Post Script " – 
 "Bagatelle #2" (Béla Bartók) – 
 "Tango '92" – 
 "Rhumbata" – 
 "Four in One" (Thelonious Monk) –

Personnel 
 Chick Corea – piano
 Gary Burton – vibraphone, marimba

Other credits
 Gildas Boclé – photography
 Evelyn Brechtlein – production coordination
 Jordan d'Alessio – assistant engineer
 Bernie Kirsh – engineer, Mixing
 Darren Mora – assistant engineer
 Ron Moss – executive producer
 Robert Read – assistant engineer
 Alan Yoshida – mastering

Chart performance

References 

Gary Burton albums
Chick Corea albums
1997 albums
Concord Records albums